David Wayne (January 1, 1958 – May 10, 2005) was an American singer of the heavy metal bands Metal Church, Reverend and Wayne.

Biography
From 1982 to 1988, Wayne appeared as vocalist on three studio albums and one live album by Metal Church. He was influenced by singers like Rob Halford and has influenced singers like James Hetfield.

When he left Metal Church 1988, Wayne formed Reverend, which remained active even after his death. His legacy as a vocalist is captured in Metal Church's only live album, Live, recorded in 1986 in Texas while on tour with Anthrax.

He also started a band called Wayne (or David Wayne's Metal Church) after leaving Metal Church and joined ex-Cradle of Filth guitarist Stuart Anstis in Bastardsun.

Wayne died on May 10, 2005, from complications following a car crash. Before joining Metal Church, Wayne was a US Army field medic.

Discography

Metal Church
 Metal Church (1984)
 The Dark (1986)
 Live (1998)
 Masterpeace (1999)

Reverend
Reverend (1989)
World Won't Miss You (1990)
Play God (1991)
Live (1992)
A Gathering of Demons (2001)

Wayne (David Wayne's Metal Church)
 Metal Church (2001)

References

External links
 Obituary
 David Wayne's memorial program
 HardRadio.com interview with David Wayne

1958 births
2005 deaths
20th-century American singers
American heavy metal singers
Singers from Washington (state)
People from Renton, Washington
Road incident deaths in Washington (state)
21st-century American singers
Metal Church members
20th-century American male singers
21st-century American male singers
United States Army soldiers